Love in the Moonlight is a South Korean television series starring Park Bo-gum, Kim Yoo-jung, Jung Jin-young, Chae Soo-bin, and Kwak Dong-yeon. It is a coming-of-age story and youth romance set during 19th-century Joseon Dynasty based on the web novel Moonlight Drawn by Clouds which was first serialized on Naver in 2013 and consequently published as a five-part series of books in 2015. It aired on KBS2 at 22:00 (KST) every Monday and Tuesday for 18 episodes from August 22, 2016, until October 18, 2016.

A domestic hit, Moonlight achieved a peak audience rating of 23.3% in South Korea and was praised for its production, performances and music. It won Best Drama Series at the 22nd Asian Television Awards, and received six nominations at the 53rd Baeksang Arts Awards where it won Popularity Awards for leads Park and Kim. The press referred to its influence as "Moonlight Syndrome" as it topped topicality, content and brand reputation charts in and beyond its run.

The series aired worldwide, with English subtitles, starting August 23, 2016 every Tuesday and Wednesday at 21:50 (KST) on KBS World. It also streams internationally, on Viki.

Synopsis
The series is a coming of age story about Crown Prince Lee Yeong's (Park Bo-gum) growth from a boy into revered monarch and his unlikely relationship with eunuch Hong Ra-on (Kim Yoo-jung).

Cast

Main
Park Bo-gum as Lee Yeong
Jung Yoon-seok as young Yeong
 He is the only son of the King and heir to the throne. Smart, bright, and mischievous, he is disliked by his servants for being unpredictable. He has an affinity for arts and music. He initially disliked his father blaming him for his mother's death. He is close to consort Park and dislikes Kim Heon and Queen Kim. He falls for Ra-on.
Kim Yoo-jung as Hong Ra-on/Hong Sam-nom
Kim Ji-young as young Ra-on
Popular and street-smart, she was raised as a boy by her mother and makes a living by disguising herself as a male relationship counselor and romance novel author under the name Sam-nom. She eventually became a eunuch of Yeong. Looking for her mother, she hides immense pain behind her cheerful attitude. She falls in love with Lee Yeong.
Jung Jin-young as Kim Yoon-sung
Lee Hyo-je as young Yoon-sung
Charismatic and poised, he is a scholar born to a powerful family. He grew up alongside Yeong and used to be best friends with him. He knew Ra-on's secret since their first meeting but pretends to not know it. 
Chae Soo-bin as Jo Ha-yeon
A lady ahead of her generation, she is proud, worldly and straightforward. As the daughter of the influential Minister of Rites, she was chosen as crown princess of Yeong.
Kwak Dong-yeon as Kim Byung-yeon
Noh Kang-min as young Byung-yeon
A skilled swordsman and scholar, he is also the Head of the Royal Guard of the Crown Prince's palace. Not only is he Yeong's childhood friend, he is also his trusted confidant. However he hides a secret that he cannot tell Lee-yeong, for fear of losing his trust.

Supporting

Royals

Kim Seung-soo as the King
Seo Jeong-yeon as Queen Yoon
Jeon Mi-seon as Park Suk-ui
Jung Hye-sung as Princess Myeong-eun
Heo Jung-eun as Princess Yeongeun, Lady Park's daughter
Kim Jin-yi as Pregnant court lady	

Eunuchs and maids

Jang Gwang as Eunuch Han 
Lee Jun-hyeok as Eunuch Jang
Jo Hee-bong as Eunuch Sung
Choi Dae-chul as Eunuch Ma
Tae Hang-ho as Do Gi
Oh Eui-shik as Park Seong Yeol
Cha Joo-young as Ae Sim-i
Jung Yoo-min as Wol-hee

Kim clan

Chun Ho-jin as Kim Heon, Prime Minister
Han Soo-yeon as Queen Kim
Park Chul-min as Kim Eui-gyo, Minister of Personnel
Bang Joong-hyun as Kim Geun-gyo, Minister of Taxation

Hong clan

Jung Hae-kyun as Hong Gyeong-nae
Kim Yeo-jin as Kim So-sa

Jo clan and advisors

Lee Dae-yeon as Jo Man-hyeong, Minister of Rites
Ahn Nae-sang as Jeong Yak-yong
Ahn Se-ha as Master Jung Deok-ho

Special appearances

Kim Byung-chul as Yeong's teacher
Cha Tae-hyun as a farm servant
Cho Yeo-jeong as a noble lady
Jung Yi-rang as gukbap lady
Lee Sung-jae as master Jeong (Ep.4)
Lee Moon-sik as a man who castrates
Kim Seul-gi as a eunuch trainee

Production

Development and casting
In December 2015, KBS Media announced that they will be adapting and producing the popular novel Moonlight Drawn by Clouds written by Yoon Yi-soo. Park Bo-gum joined the project in February 2016 and Kim Yoo-jung boarded in April. The first script reading was held in Yeoido, Seoul on May 26, 2016 and filming began in early June.Love in the Moonlight is the second collaboration between director Kim Seong-yoon and writers Kim Min-jung and Im Ye-jin after working on Who Are You: School 2015 and director Baek Sang-hoon, cinematographer Kim Si-hyeong and music director Gaemi after working on Descendants of the Sun (2016).

Due to high audience ratings, KBS negotiated for the production to extend its original 18 episodes to 20. Chief producer Kang Byung-taek declined saying that the framework of the story had already been laid out and it would only yield complications with the cast and crew's respective schedules.

Promotion
The drama's first teaser, with lead actor Park dressed in dragon robe dancing to Jessy Matador's French pop-song "Bomba" in front of Gwanghwamun, was released in July 2016 and became a viral hit.

In a press conference held on August 18, 2016, director Kim Seong-yoon indicated that despite the series being set in the 19th century, the production aimed to show a more contemporary message adding: "Our focus was on creating a romance that's pretty and charming but also sad. We'd like viewers to be able to identify with the emotions displayed. There's no grand metaphor. Rather than unveiling a political message, we focused on telling a story that's easy to identify with."

Original soundtrack

In August 2016, OU Entertainment's Gaemi, real name Kang Dong-yoon, joined the project as music director. Jinyoung, who plays Yoon-sung, composed and produced "Misty Road" sung by Ben. "My Person", which lead actor Park finished recording in October 2016 was co-written by composer Kim Se-jin. It topped Melon, Mnet, Bugs, olleh, Soribada, Genie, Naver and Monkey3 charts upon its release.

The two-disc soundtrack album was released on October 27, 2016 and consists of 13 tracks including a humming version of "Because I Miss You", 13 instrumentals and three special background music created by folk-fusion band Second Moon.

The drama marked the comeback of acclaimed balladeers Sung Si-kyung and Baek Ji-young after two years.

Track list

Chart performance

Press

Reception
[[File:Cast of Love in the Moonlight, August 2016.png|thumb|250px|(L-R): Jinyoung, Kim, Park, Chae and Kwak at Moonlight'''s press conference, August 2016]]
The series was met with praise by critics and audiences for its production, performances and music. It doubled its premiere ratings on its third episode and remained the undisputed #1 against 3 public broadcasting dramas in the same timeslot. In addition, it became KBS's highest-rated Monday/Tuesday drama since 2010. It also dominated topicality, content and brand reputation charts in and beyond its run which led the media to call its popularity "Moonlight Syndrome".

Costume designer Lee Jin-hee was also commended for her work on the production's Joseon-era clothes. Lead actor Park's hanbok were put on exhibit at Tokyo International Forum during his Japan fan meeting the following year.

Sales of the novel experienced a 56% increase upon the drama's airing. The overseas demand consequently led to its translation in Mandarin and plans on Japanese and Thai translations, among others. Both KakaoTalk and LINE released Moonlight digital stickers and three of Raon's outfits were made available for purchase in mobile game "I Love Nicky". The eternal bracelets of Yeong and Raon went on sale as official merchandise and the drama's 336-page official photo essay book became a best-seller. Moonlight has also been parodied in shows like Saturday Night Live Korea and The Return of Superman, among others. In September 2016, KBS Media acquired the rights to adapt Moonlight'' into a musical production.

On October 19, 2016, Park, Kim, Jinyoung and Kwak held a fan-signing event, wearing their drama costumes, at the historic  Gyeongbokgung Palace where scenes of the drama were filmed. More than 5,000 fans gathered to see the cast and the event was also live-streamed on Facebook. A gesture of gratitude for the drama's success, it was a collaborative effort between KBS and the Korea Creative Content Agency.

In partnership with Viki, the series screened at University of California, Berkeley in October 2016 as a joint project of the campus' Korea-centric organizations, KUNA and K-Popular.

Ratings
In this table,  represent the lowest ratings and  represent the highest ratings.

Awards and nominations

References

External links

 
 
 
 
 

Korean-language television shows
2016 South Korean television series debuts
2016 South Korean television series endings
Korean Broadcasting System television dramas
South Korean historical television series
Television series set in the Joseon dynasty
Television shows based on South Korean novels
Cross-dressing in television
Television series by KBS Media